IK Arvika (Idrottsklubben Arvika, i.e., Sport Club Arvika) is a Swedish football club located in Arvika.

Background

IK Arvika currently plays in Division 3 Värmland which is the fifth tier of Swedish football. They play their home matches at Solviksvallen in Arvika.

The club is affiliated to Värmlands Fotbollförbund.

Footnotes

External links
 IK Arvika – Official website

Football clubs in Värmland County